Little Valley English High School (LVEHS) is a public school runs under the Shri Harnarayan Shiksha Evem Seva Samiti in Kailaras, Dist. Morena, Madhya Pradesh, India. It is a co-educational English-Medium High School.

History 
It was founded and chaired by Mr. Gaurav Bansal and its principal is Mr. Neerendra Singh Tomar. It evolved from a middle school established in Kailaras in 2014 to become a co-educational English medium High School

Campus and Facilities 
The building of Little Valley English High School has three blocks which house the Junior, Middle and Senior classes. There is an open courtyard in the middle of building, and open-to-sky spaces between rooms. The School has Physics, Chemistry, Biology, Computer, I.T. and Language labs. In addition there are Junior Science lab for classes V to VIII apart from the well maintained senior science labs.

External links
 Official website

High schools and secondary schools in Madhya Pradesh
Educational institutions established in 2014
2014 establishments in Madhya Pradesh